The Butuanon are an ethnolinguistic group who inhabited in the region of Caraga.  They are part of the wider ethnolinguistic group Bisaya people, who constitute the largest Filipino ethnolinguistic group in the country.

Area
Butuanons live in the provinces of Agusan del Norte and Agusan del Sur. Some live in Misamis Oriental or in Surigao del Norte, all of which are in the northeastern corner of Mindanao.

Demographics
Butuanons number about 1,420,000. They are the descendants of Austronesian-speaking immigrants who came from South China during the Iron Age. The native language of Butuanons is the Butuanon language, but most Butuanon nowadays primarily speak the Cebuano language, because of the mass influx of Cebuano settlers to Mindanao, and Filipino, English as second languages. They founded the Butuan Kingdom in the 10th century. While historically Hindu, Buddhist and animist, today most are Roman Catholics due to missionary activity under Spanish colonization.

See also 
Butuanon language

Caraga

 Butuan
 Butuan (historical polity)

Ethnic groups in the Philippines

 Visayan peoples
 Surigaonon people
 Tausūg people

Ethnic groups in the Philippines
Ethnic groups in Mindanao